The ajaeng is a Korean string instrument. It is a wide zither with strings of twisted silk. It is played with a slender stick of forsythia wood that is drawn across the strings in the manner of a bow. The ajaeng mainly plays the bass part in ensemble music. And the ajaeng is divided into two types. The ajaeng used in court music is called jeongak ajaeng, and the ajaeng used in folk music is called sanjo ajaeng. The original version of the instrument, and that used in court music (called the jeongak ajaeng), has seven strings; while the ajaeng used for sanjo and sinawi (called the sanjo ajaeng) has eight. Some instruments have as many as nine to twelve strings.

The ajaeng is generally played while seated on the floor. It has a tone similar to that of a cello, but raspier. Some contemporary players prefer to use an actual horsehair bow rather than a stick, believing the sound to be smoother. The instrument is used in court, aristocratic, and folk music, as well as in contemporary classical music and film scores.

The traditional ajaeng is divided into a daeajaeng (ko:대아쟁, hanja: 大牙箏) for jeongak (ko:정악, hanja: 正樂) and a soajaeng for folk music (hanja: 小牙箏, or sanjo ajaeng, hanja: 散調牙箏). Since the second half of the 20th century, various improved ajaengs have been made and used to play various ranges.

History 

The ajaeng, having its origins in Tang Dynasty China, was derived from the Chinese yazheng, which was introduced to Korea during the Goryeo Dynasty.

In 1430, Uiryesangjeongso, the organization for the arrangement of court music and ceremonies arranged the institution of the Goryeo Dynasty and included the ajaeng as one of the instruments used to perform Dangak.  On the 'Five manners' in the annals of King Sejong, it describes the appearance of the ajaeng. The line was seven, and the left was broken, with catters placed on it.

According to Akhak gwebeom, the ajaeng was used only for Dangak before that time, but at the time of King Seongjong, it was also used for Hyangak.

How to play 
Instead of holding the ajaeng on the player's lap, like a gayageum or a harpoon, the instrument is put on a pedestal called a chosang, and the head is hung at an angle, and the player sits right with the bent tail on the floor. The bark of the forsythia tree is peeled, and the surface is smoothed to make a ridge. Ribbon is used to paint the rosin because it reinforces the rubbing sound of string and string. Though the sound is rough because it makes a sound by rubbing a thick line with a forsythia tree instead of a horsehair, it is also a feature of the ajaeng. Nowadays, however, Sanjo Ajaeng is using a horsehooking band. Sometimes, the ajaeng can be plucked in the manner of a gayageum.

See also
Korean music
Yazheng

References

External links
2007 With Angel... 10월 4일 목요일 저녁 7시30분 국립국악원 우면당
Ajaeng page
아쟁의 홈페이지에 오신것을 환영합니다.

Video
Tenderness - Seola, KIM with Ajaeng Chamber POEM
Winter Ocean(겨울바다) by Seola Kim
Nabilela(나빌레라) by Ajaeng chamber "Poem" - Seola Kim
Twilight(2013) by Seola Kim

Bowed instruments
Zithers
Korean musical instruments